Thierry Paterlini (born 27 April 1975 in Chur, Graubünden) is a Swiss professional ice hockey defenceman. He currently plays for the ZSC Lions of the Swiss National League A. He first played professionally in the National League B with Grasshopper Club Zürich in 1993. Paterlini debuted in the top league in 1996 for SC Bern. He played four seasons with Bern, four with HC Davos, three with the ZSC Lions, and two with HC Lugano.

Seger was selected to play for the Switzerland men's national ice hockey team at the 2010 Winter Olympics. He previously represented Switzerland at the 1994 and 1995 IIHF World U20 Championships, the 1997, 2002, 2003, 2004, 2005, 2006, 2007, 2008, and 2009 Ice Hockey World Championship, and the 2006 Winter Olympics.

Career statistics

Regular season and playoffs

International

External links

1975 births
Living people
GCK Lions players
HC Davos players
HC Lugano players
HC Sierre players
Ice hockey players at the 2006 Winter Olympics
Ice hockey players at the 2010 Winter Olympics
Olympic ice hockey players of Switzerland
People from Chur
SC Bern players
SC Rapperswil-Jona Lakers players
Swiss ice hockey left wingers
ZSC Lions players
Sportspeople from Graubünden